Sojourner "Jo" Mullein, one of the characters known as Green Lantern, is a superheroine appearing in American comic books published by DC Comics. Created by Hugo Award-winning author N. K. Jemisin, with artwork by Jamal Campbell, she is a member of the Green Lantern Corps.

Her first appearance takes place in the Young Animal 12-issue comic series Far Sector, of which she is the main protagonist.

Publication history 
Sojourner Mullein first appeared in Far Sector #1, a 12-issue comic series where she starred as the main protagonist. It was published on November 13, 2019, with a cover date of January, 2020. Far Sector won the 2022 Hugo Award for "Best Graphic Story or Comic". Mullein later begins appearing in mainstream Green Lantern comics following Infinite Frontier, appearing first in Green Lantern (vol. 6) #2.

Fictional character biography

Early life 
Jo Mullein was raised a child of divorce in New York City. After witnessing the 9/11 attacks, Jo was inspired to make a difference in the world, graduating valedictorian in her high school and joining the United States Army, and later the New York City Police Department. During her police career, she witnessed her partner beat a suspect nearly to death. Before being able to turn him in she was suddenly fired after being tagged in a Black Lives Matter Facebook post. After being fired, Jo was approached by a Guardian of the Universe, who issued her a Power ring and a challenge: "One year to make a difference."

Infinite Frontier 
Following Infinite Frontier, Mullein began appearing in mainstream Green Lantern comics, becoming a main Green Lantern alongside Hal Jordan, John Stewart, etc..

Powers and abilities

Other versions 

 In the possible future of Future State, Sojourner Mullein was the leader of the Justice League.
 The teen version of Jo made a cameo appearance the DC Super Hero Girls episode, "#CruzControl.

Collected editions

References

Comics characters introduced in 2019
2019 comics debuts
2020 comics endings
DC Comics American superheroes
DC Comics female superheroes
Fictional American people
DC Comics LGBT superheroes
African-American superheroes
Fictional bisexual females
Green Lantern Corps officers
Fictional United States Army personnel
Fictional New York City Police Department officers
Female soldier and warrior characters in comics